The 2002 World Championship in Mahjong was held at the Hotel Grand Place in Tokyo, Japan, from 23 to 27 October in 2002. The title for this competition was "The Festival for Culture and Sport in Mah Jong".

The competition ran in cooperation between the Ningbo City Mahjong Sport Association and the Japan Mahjong Organizing Committee (JMOC). JMOC was formed with four Japanese organizations including the Japan Mahjong Federation, the All-Japan Mahjong Society, the Japan Health Mahjong Association, and the Mahjong Museum.

Competition
This championship is not certified as the official first worldwide championship in mahjong because it had been held before the World Mahjong Organization was formed in 2006.

Although it was offered to China at first and was going to be held in Ningbo, which is known as the origin of mahjong, the location was moved to Japan because a large event was going to be held there.

For this reason, the competition was held at the Hotel Grand Palace in Iidabashi, Tokyo. 100 competitors with 25 teams from 8 nations, Bulgaria, China, Japan, Netherlands, Russia, Sweden, Taiwan, and the US, took part in this competition. JMOC held primarily tournaments in Tokyo and Osaka.

Results
The names are ordered as given name and surname.

Individual

Team

Participating countries
100 competitors with 25 teams from 8 countries participated. Although Shinnicni Tokuda did not register for this competition and he was Japanese, he played as Kenneth Tokuda for the US team because a vacancy occurred.

 (1)
 (35)
 (41)
 (3)
 (2)
 (2)
 (4)
 (12)

References

Mahjong world championships